The Edough Massif, Edough Mountains or Djebel Edough is a mountain range of the Maghreb area in Northern Africa.

Geography
These mountains are a segment of the Tell Atlas alpine chain of eastern Algeria that is part of the wider Atlas Range. The Edough Massif stretches between the Cap de Garde and the Cap de Fer.

The highest point of the massif is the Bou Zizi (1008 m), located between Annaba and El Marsa.

Geologically, these mountains are a Miocene crystalline metamorphic core complex.

Ecology

The Edough Massif has a Mediterranean forest cover where the cork oak (Quercus suber), a hardy Mediterranean tree, predominates. Snow is not rare in the winter and the mountains are often covered with fog, which allows ferns to grow among the undergrowth.

The forest of the Edough Massif is very vulnerable to wildfires. Vast surfaces have been burned in the last decades.

The Edough Massif was the last home of the lion (Panthera leo) in North Africa. The last lion of Algeria was killed in the Edough Massif in 1890.
The massif is also the natural habitat of the Edough ribbed newt (Pleurodeles poireti), an endangered species. The vulnerable North African Fire Salamander (Salamandra algira) is also found in the range. Edoughnura, a genus of springtails belonging to the Neanuridae subfamily, is named after this range.

Features

See also
List of mountains in Algeria

References

External links

 Geological data
 Pictures

Mountain ranges of Algeria
Mountain ranges of the Atlas Mountains